The Sixth, Seventh, and Tenth Street Stone Arch Bridges are three stone arch bridges in Charleston, Illinois, which carry Sixth, Seventh, and Tenth Streets across the Town Branch of Cassell Creek. Prominent local stonemason Alexander Briggs built the three bridges during the 1890s, when increasing development in Charleston expanded across the creek. The three bridges were all built from locally quarried limestone, and each has a single arch design with abutments at both ends. While Charleston has thirteen bridges across the Town Branch, these three are the only stone arch bridges in the city.

The bridges were added to the National Register of Historic Places on August 8, 2001.

References

Road bridges on the National Register of Historic Places in Illinois
National Register of Historic Places in Coles County, Illinois
Bridges in Coles County, Illinois
Stone arch bridges in the United States